is a global tire and rubber company based in Japan.  It is part of the Sumitomo Group. The company makes a wide range of rubber based products, including automobile tires, golf balls and tennis balls. Sumitomo brands include Dunlop Tyres (in certain regions of Asia, Africa, and Latin America), Falken Tire and Ohtsu Tire.

History

The company traces its origins to 1909, when the Sumitomo Group made an investment in Dunlop Japan, the newly formed Japanese subsidiary of the British company Dunlop Rubber.  Over the years Sumitomo and Dunlop developed a close business relationship, and in 1963 the Sumitomo Group acquired control of Dunlop Japan and renamed it Sumitomo Rubber Industries Ltd.

In 1985, when Dunlop Rubber was taken over by BTR plc, the company acquired the automobile tire assets of Dunlop, including the right to use the Dunlop brand on automobile tires.  The acquisition did not include the US and Australian businesses, which were separately owned, but in 1986 Sumitomo also acquired the Dunlop Tire Corporation of the US from its management.

In 1997, Sumitomo formed a joint venture with Goodyear Tire and Rubber Company, by which Goodyear and Sumitomo agreed to manufacture tires for each other's markets, including Dunlop branded tires.  As part of the agreement, Goodyear acquired 75% interests in Dunlop Tyres, the UK company which Sumitomo had formed, and in Dunlop Tire Corporation.  Goodyear and Sumitomo also made investments in each other.

On 14 February 2014, Goodyear announced its intention to dissolve its partnership with Sumitomo due to alleged  "anticompetitive conduct". On June 4, 2015, Goodyear announced the end of its joint venture with SRI, effective end of year 2015. The brand Dunlop will be shared between the 2 companies:
 in North America, Goodyear will control the Dunlop brand for replacement tires and for new cars made by non-Japanese auto makers. Sumitomo Rubber will hold rights to the Dunlop brand for new cars made by Japanese auto makers, as well as for motorcycles
 in most parts of Europe, Goodyear will control the Dunlop brand
 in Japan, Sumitomo Rubber will retain rights to the Dunlop brand

In December 2013 Sumitomo Rubber Industries acquired Apollo Tyres South Africa (Pty) Ltd from Apollo Tyres, which owned the Dunlop tyre brand in South Africa, as part of its strategic global development plans. It subsequently renamed the company Sumitomo Rubber South Africa (Pty) Ltd.

Sumitomo Rubber South Africa manufactures the Dunlop, Sumitomo and Falken passenger car tyre brands in Ladysmith, KwaZulu-Natal.

The Ladysmith plant began to produce Dunlop truck and bus radial tyres in July 2018, following the second of two large investments by Sumitomo Rubber Industries to upgrade and modernise the plant.

Dunlop truck and bus radial tyres produced in Ladysmith will be sold in the South African market and will also be exported to several African states from 2019.

Falken Tire

The Falken Tire brand was launched by Sumitomo in Japan in 1983, and was introduced in North America two years later.

In January 2016, after the dissolution of the partnership with Goodyear, the Sumitomo Rubber USA factory in Tonawanda, New York began to produce Falken Tire-branded tires.

SRI Sports Limited

SRI Sports Limited is the subsidiary of Sumitomo that specializes in sports equipment, with the main focus being tennis and golf. SRI Sports owns Srixon, XXIO, Cleveland Golf, its subsidiary, Never Compromise, as well as rights to the Dunlop name in most parts of the world.

Srixon produces tennis balls, golf balls, golf clubs, and a full range of golfing accessories. It holds several professional golfers under endorsement deals including Hideki Matsuyama, Shane Lowry, Graeme McDowell, Keegan Bradley and Brooks Koepka.

Cleveland Golf also makes a full range of golf equipment, and has endorsement deals with Vijay Singh and Boo Weekley among others.

Following the acquisition of Cleveland Golf, SRI Sports announced their intention to consolidate its operations, with Cleveland overseeing marketing and distribution across North America, with Srixon doing the same in Europe and Australia, and Dunlop taking over in Asia.

In 2018 Dunlop entered into a partnership with Tennis Australia and became the official ball of the Australian Open, in a multi-year deal.

Acquisition of Dunlop brands from Sports Direct 
In 2016, Sumitomo Rubber filed for regulatory approval before the Philippine Competition Commission in connection with its planned acquisition of Dunlop-related wholesale, manufacturing, and licensing business from Sports Direct.

The company intended to acquire the entire issued share capital of Dunlop Brands Limited, Dunlop Slazenger 1902 Limited, and Dunlop Australia Limited, and the Dunlop-related business of Dunlop Sports Group Americas, Inc. which are subsidiaries of Sports Direct.

Sumitomo Rubber manufactures and sells tires under the Dunlop brand name in many countries including Japan, as well as sports goods in Japan, Taiwan, and South Korea.

The Philippine Competition Commission has approved the regulatory filing for the said acquisition in the same year. The acquisition allowed Sumitomo Rubber to consolidate the Dunlop brand across various products including sports goods worldwide.

References 

 International Directory of Company Histories (1992), St James Press , Vol V, p. 252

External links
 Sumitomo Rubber Group English site
 Sumitomo Rubber Group Japanese site
 Sumitomo Rubber Industries, Ltd.

Tire manufacturers of Japan
Automotive companies of Japan
Sporting goods manufacturers of Japan
Companies listed on the Tokyo Stock Exchange
Companies listed on the Osaka Exchange
Manufacturing companies based in Kobe
Multinational companies headquartered in Japan
Mitsui
Manufacturing companies established in 1909
Japanese brands
Japanese companies established in 1909
1970s initial public offerings
Sumitomo Group
Rubber industry